Weightlifting has been contested at every Summer Olympic Games since the 1920 Summer Olympics, as well as twice before then. It debuted at the 1896 Summer Olympics, in Athens, Greece, and was also an event at the 1904 Games.

Summary

Events

Men's events
In the early Games, all lifters competed in the same events, regardless of their individual body weights.
1896
One hand lift
Two hand lift
1904
Two hand lift
All-around dumbbell

When the sport returned to the Olympic Games in 1920, the competition was structured as a set of weight classes. The number of classes and weight limits for each class have changed several times, as shown in the following table.

Women's events
Women's weightlifting made its Olympic debut at the 2000 Games in Sydney, with seven weight classes.

Medal table
Sources:

As of the 2020 Summer Olympics, last updated: March 2022.

Nations

Multiple medalists
The table shows those who have won at least 2 gold medals. Boldface denotes active weightlifters and highest medal count among all weightlifters (including these who not included in these tables) per type.

See also
List of Olympic medalists in weightlifting
List of Olympic records in weightlifting
List of Olympic venues in weightlifting
World Weightlifting Championships
Powerlifting at the Summer Paralympics
Weightlifting at the 1906 Intercalated Games

References

 
Weight classes
Sports at the Summer Olympics
Olympics